The brown-capped weaver (Ploceus insignis) is a species of bird in the family Ploceidae.
It is found in Angola, Burundi, Cameroon, Republic of the Congo, Democratic Republic of the Congo, Equatorial Guinea, Kenya, Nigeria, Rwanda, South Sudan, Tanzania, and Uganda.

References

brown-capped weaver
Birds of the Gulf of Guinea
Birds of Sub-Saharan Africa
Birds of Central Africa
Birds of East Africa
brown-capped weaver
Taxonomy articles created by Polbot